Prohysterophora chionopa is a species of moth of the family Tortricidae. It is found in Algeria and Tunisia.

References

Moths described in 1891
Cochylini